The Divide Sheep Camp, also known as Niland's Cabins, is a ranch site on the Little Snake River in Carbon County, Wyoming, near Baggs. The camp was established in 1909 for summer use by sheepmen of the Niland-Tierney Sheep Company and others in the Little Snake valley. Eventually becoming the Divide Sheep Company the company operated until 1974, leaving the structures intact. The site represents a moderately-well-preserved turn-of-the-century sheep camp.

The Divide Sheep Camp was placed on the National Register of Historic Places on February 9, 1984.

References

External links
 Divide Sheep Camp at the Wyoming State Historic Preservation Office

National Register of Historic Places in Carbon County, Wyoming
Buildings and structures completed in 1914